The IEEE Judith A. Resnik Award is a technical field award presented by the Institute of Electrical and Electronics Engineers (IEEE) to either an individual, or a team, "for outstanding contributions to space engineering within the fields of interest of the IEEE".

The award is named in honor of Judith A. Resnik, a mission specialist, killed when the Space Shuttle Challenger disintegrated during launch in January 1986 and was established later that year. Recipients receive a bronze medal, certificate, and honorarium.

Through 2012, the IEEE administered the award process. The IEEE Aerospace and Electronic Systems Society assumed administration of the award starting in 2015.

Recipients 
The following people have received the IEEE/IEEE-AESS Judith A. Resnik Award:

See also

 List of space technology awards

References

Judith A. Resnik Award
Space-related awards
Awards established in 1986
1986 establishments in the United States